Werner Lueg (16 September 1931 – 13 July 2014) was a West German middle distance runner who equalised Lennart Strand's and Gunder Hägg's 1500 m world record in 3:43.0 min in Berlin in 1952. Along with Otto Peltzer he is the only German to have held the 1500 m world record. He also won a bronze medal over 1500 m at the 1952 Summer Olympics in Helsinki. The Olympic final was won by Josy Barthel. Lueg was born in Brackwede, near Bielefeld.

References

Werner Lueg's profile at Sports Reference.com
Werner Lueg's obituary 

1931 births
2014 deaths
German male middle-distance runners
Athletes (track and field) at the 1952 Summer Olympics
Olympic athletes of West Germany
Olympic bronze medalists for West Germany
World record setters in athletics (track and field)
Medalists at the 1952 Summer Olympics
Sportspeople from Bielefeld
Olympic bronze medalists in athletics (track and field)